This is a list of the members of the Australian House of Representatives in the 12th Australian Parliament, which was elected at the 1929 election on 12 October 1929. The incumbent Nationalist Party of Australia led by Prime Minister of Australia Stanley Bruce in power since 1923 with coalition partner the Country Party led by Earle Page was defeated by the opposition Australian Labor Party led by James Scullin.  Labor won with its then largest-ever majority in the federal parliament. However major divisions within the Labor over policy responses to the Great Depression, and the subsequent creation of the United Australia Party led to thirty parliamentarians changing their party affiliation in 1931.

Notes

References

Members of Australian parliaments by term
20th-century Australian politicians